Walter Millis (March 16, 1899 – March 17, 1968) was an editorial and staff writer for the New York Herald Tribune from 1924 to 1954. Millis was a staff member of the Fund for the Republic from 1954 to 1968. He later became the director of the Fund for the Republic's study of demilitarization in 1954.

Millis, widely recognized as a historical writer, wrote eight books including: Road to War: America 1914-1917, This is Pearl! The United States and Japan—1941, Why Europe Fights, Viewed Without Alarm: Europe Today, Arms and Men: A Study of American Military History, The Martial Spirit:  A Study of Our War with Spain, and An End to Arms. He also edited The Forrestal Diaries.

Early life
Millis was born in Atlanta, GA, the son of John Millis, a regular army officer, and Mrs. Mary Raoul Millis. He graduated from Yale University, although his studies were interrupted by World War I, when he joined the Army and became a second lieutenant in the field artillery. He received his A.B. degree from Yale in 1920.

Family
His first marriage, to the former Norah Thompson, ended in divorce. They had two children, Walter Millis, Jr. and Sarah (Millis) McCoy. His second marriage, to fashion journalist Eugenia Sheppard in 1944, ended with his death. He was survived by six grandchildren.

Sources

External links
Author and Book Info.com

1899 births
1968 deaths
20th-century American historians
American male non-fiction writers
20th-century American non-fiction writers
New York Herald Tribune people
Place of death missing
Writers from Atlanta
Historians from New York (state)
Historians from Georgia (U.S. state)
20th-century American male writers